Faculty of Arts, University of Peradeniya is the largest single faculty in the entire university system of Sri Lanka.

Location

Faculty of Arts is located approximately in the middle of the university's main campus. Faculty is about two kilometres away from the Galaha junction in the Galaha road. It is well known for its supreme natural beauty.

History
Faculty's history dates back to the beginning of Sri Lanka's university system. Sri Lanka's first university, University of Ceylon is established in 1942 under the guidance of Sir Ivor Jennings. Faculty of Arts and Faculty of Oriental Studies were two of the 4 academic faculties in the university. They were located in Colombo at the beginning. With the establishment of the Peradeniya campus, those faculties were brought to Peradeniya in 1952. The two faculties operated separately until they were amalgamated in 1972.

Academic programs
Faculty of Arts offers a number of undergraduate and postgraduate degrees.

Undergraduate study
Faculty has 16 academic departments for undergraduate study. Traditional degrees offered at undergraduate level are; Bachelor of Arts (General), Bachelor of Arts (Special) – in 18 different disciplines and Bachelor of Commerce. Other than that, faculty has started conducting two new degree programs, Bachelor of Business Administration and LLB in recent years.

Departments of the Arts faculty 
Arts faculty of the University of Perdeniya has 18 departments, Units and centers. Those departments are separately established for provide course enrollments.

Postgraduate study
Postgraduate degrees leading to Master of Arts (M.A.), Master of Philosophy (M.Phil.) and Doctor of Philosophy (Ph.D.) and several Postgraduate Diplomas are also offered. Study programs are conducted in all English, Sinhala and Tamil media.

Library
Main library of University of Peradeniya serves primarily the Arts faculty. It is one of the largest libraries in Sri Lanka containing more than 800,000 items.

Organization

Dean is the head of the academic and non-academic staff. Heads of departments, the assistant registrar, bursar several other key officers work under the dean.

Architecture

Faculty of Arts, University of Peradeniya is also known for its architecture. The Senate building, located within the faculty, is constructed on hundreds of stone pillars. Each of them contains traditional carvings of Sri Lanka. Other than that, the seven-floor library building and Sarachchandra open-air theatre are notable constructions within the faculty. Many traditional sculptures are seen all over the faculty premises.

See also
University of Peradeniya

References

External links 
 

Arts